Chota may refer to:

 Chota (Cherokee town), which once existed in present-day Monroe County, Tennessee
 Chota, Ecuador
 Chota, Peru, a city in Chota District, the capital of Chota Province, Peru.
 Chota District, a district in Chota Province, Peru.
 Chota Province, a province of the Cajamarca Region in Peru
 Chota (automobile), an English automobile
 Chota (footballer), Spanish footballer
 Roman Catholic Territorial Prelature of Chota, Peru
 A dialect of the Sadri language
 A subdivision of a sotnia equivalent to a platoon